Loch Broom is a freshwater trout loch, located in the hills  east of Pitlochry, within Perth and Kinross, Scotland.

References

Broom
Broom
Tay catchment